Liberty Township is one of the nineteen townships of Wood County, Ohio, United States.  The 2010 census found 1,766 people in the township.

Geography
Located in the southern part of the county, it borders the following townships:
Plain Township - north
Center Township - northeast corner
Portage Township - east
Bloom Township - southeast corner
Henry Township - south
Jackson Township - southwest corner
Milton Township - west
Weston Township - northwest corner

Part of the village of Portage is located in northeastern Liberty Township, and the unincorporated community of Rudolph lies in the township's east.

Name and history
Liberty Township was established in 1835. It is one of twenty-five Liberty Townships statewide.

Government
The township is governed by a three-member board of trustees, who are elected in November of odd-numbered years to a four-year term beginning on the following January 1. Two are elected in the year after the presidential election and one is elected in the year before it. There is also an elected township fiscal officer, who serves a four-year term beginning on April 1 of the year after the election, which is held in November of the year before the presidential election. Vacancies in the fiscal officership or on the board of trustees are filled by the remaining trustees.

References

External links
County website

Townships in Wood County, Ohio
Townships in Ohio